The fifty pence (50p) coin was a subdivision of the Irish pound. It was introduced in Ireland on 17 February 1970. It replaced the ten-shilling coin and ten-shilling note when decimalised, and due to this conversion was introduced a year before Decimal Day in 1971.

It is a seven-sided coin, an equilateral curve heptagon of constant breadth (3 centimetres) and mass 13.5 grams. The sides are not straight but are curved so that the centre of curvature is the opposite apex of the coin – this is an equilateral curve which allowed the coin to roll freely in vending machines. It was of the same shape and size of the British coin of the same denomination, as both nations' pounds were pegged until 1979. The coin used the woodcock design from the pre-decimal farthing coin, introduced to the Irish Free State in 1928.

On 31 May 1988 a special design was circulated for the "Dublin Millennium", although Dublin is thought to have been founded by the Vikings in around 841 – the issue was regarded for publicity and collectors only.

The coin was designed by Tom Ryan who would later design the Irish pound coin. About 5 million of these were produced, with 50 thousand proof coins also being produced.

Production of fifty pence coins ceased between 1988 and 1996 because of previous oversupply and because of reduced demand following the introduction of the twenty pence coin. The coin was withdrawn on the advent of the euro in 2002, with its last minting issue in 2000.

References

External links

Irish coinage website – catalogue – decimal fifty pence
Coinage (Dimensions and Designs) Regulations, 1969
Coinage (Design of Fifty Pence Coin for Year 1988) Regulations, 1988

fifty pence (decimal coin)
Fifty-cent coins